is an anime and manga franchise based on the light novel series by Haruka Takachiho.

Although it is often said that these are younger versions of the original Lovely Angels Kei and Yuri, in truth this series is an alternate universe telling of Dirty Pair, set in the years 2248–49.  When Sunrise originally began the project, their idea was to make a sequel to the original Dirty Pair series, but Kyōko Tongū, the original voice actress for Kei, had long retired and moved to North America, and Saeko Shimazu, the voice of Yuri, refused to work with anyone but her original partner, forcing the project to be a remake of the original series instead.

Dirty Pair Flash was first aired in North America on PBS San Jose station Superstation KTEH as the English-subtitled version and also on Showtime’s SHO Beyond channel as the english-dubbed version. The English version of Dirty Pair Flash was licensed by ADV Films.

Plot summary
Compared to the wealthy and affluent world of the original Dirty Pair, Flash takes place in a universal human civilization where mankind is recovering from a major galactic economic crash which then spurred an intense decade of wars and conflicts before the setting's current era of stable if rather uneasy peace. A somewhat more down to earth if cynical backdrop, mankind continues on its leaps and bounds of technological and scientific progress despite economic struggles and recoveries throughout the galaxy, and many remnants and reminders of the economic crash still remain throughout. 

Kei and Yuri were originally junior auxiliary agents in the Worlds Works and Welfare Agency (W.W.W.A. or 3WA for short) when the two were paired together under the codename "Lovely Angels."  Kei was coming off her fourth probation for something she had done, and Yuri's dating exploits were common knowledge, not to mention the two had an instant dislike for each other when they met. Unlike the original pair, the two suffer from both the struggles of everyday working life and their own human faults; Kei is hotheaded and headstrong, Yuri is capricious and passive, and both share many things in common than they would like to admit: both come from backwater colonies and outpost worlds, both only have their jobs presumably as merely a headway in their yearning for something more in life, and both barely passed 3WA's academic and training screenings, despite holding one of 3WA's most renowned positions as 3WA's historically famous namesake Trouble Consultants.

Kei and Yuri were not the first to receive the codename Lovely Angels.  Years before, during the Gamorian Riots, two other women, Iris and Molly, had been given the designation Lovely Angels.  Molly was killed in action, and her partner Iris, who had lost her left arm trying to save Molly, became bitter about the lack of response from the 3WA and vanished, later becoming the notorious assassin known as "Lady Flair."

At first, Kei and Yuri refused to work with each other, and Kei even resigned from the 3WA.  However, when the "Siren" crisis erupted, Kei returned.  This was decidedly a good thing, as Yuri's ditsy new partner, Lily, had abruptly quit just as the response to the crisis started, and Kei's return came just in time, as Yuri was about to be killed by Waldess.

Afterwards, the two continued to work together, although they earned their nickname, "the Dirty Pair" because of all the collateral damage the two (unintentionally) cause in the completion of their cases.  And even though the two now get along with one another, they continue to bicker and complain to each other.

In addition to the sixteen anime episodes, there have been three novels (1994, 1997, 1999) and four "Stereo Dramas" (one in 1994, the others in 1996) written by Takachiho, as well as two sanctioned manga series (1995–96) published by Dengeki Comics.

Characters

Kei
 Born: January 1, 2231, Age 17 on the colony planet Workoh, Kei is hot-headed, impulsive, and rude, and because of this is often mistaken for being a man. Those who mention this are, as expected, reminded (painfully) that she is, in fact, a woman. Her usual response to a crisis is "shoot first and ask questions later.", but she can show insight into situations when properly motivated. She usually gets into a lot of arguments with Yuri over her "girly" attitude, but is usually the first in line to back her up when trouble happens. Kei is also very Proficient with a Blaster and uses one as her primary weapon.

 Kei has a love for jet coasters, fast-food restaurants, drinking beer, sushi, and big-game fishing. She is afraid of nothing with the exception of ghosts, zombies, and vampires. Kei has a softer side, but dislikes showing it.

Yuri
 Born: March 3, 2231, Age 17 on the colony world Shack-G, Yuri acts more stereotypically feminine than Kei. She is more concerned with getting dates and marrying a rich, handsome man than doing her job, and she gets more than her share of complaints from Kei because of this. However, if anyone ever harms her partner, it's unlikely that the offender will live to tell about it. Yuri is adept at using a plasma sword and carries one as her primary weapon.

 Yuri is the more romantic of the two. She likes romantic dinners, moonlit walks, and very wealthy men. However, she has poor luck with men, as she usually finds men who care more about what their fathers think about what happens to their prized possessions than to her.

Secondary characters

 Chief Garner

 Garner was a section chief in the 3WA at the beginning of the series. A veteran of the Gamorian Riots, he was instrumental in helping to rebuild the 3WA in the aftermath. Now approaching retirement, he has the unenviable task of molding two bickering junior auxiliary agents, Kei and Yuri, into first-class trouble consultants.

 Garner was also a good friend of the original Lovely Angels, Iris and Molly, and it troubles him that Kei and Yuri were given the 'Lovely Angels' codename by the 3WA's central mainframe. He knows of the trouble the two got into previously, and fears that they will bring shame to that honored name.

 

 Chief Poporo

 Chief Poporo became section chief supervising the Lovely Angels after Garner's retirement. He was once a trouble consultant himself, requiring a cybernetic arm after participating in the arrest of renegade weapons designer Berringer.

While he realizes Kei and Yuri's usefulness, he is irritated by all the damage they cause. He seems to be quite the henpecked husband; he often gets calls from his wife back home, asking him to go grocery shopping after work.

 

 Lady Flair

 Originally, she was known as Iris, one of the original Lovely Angels. She, along with her partner Molly, were the finest trouble consultant team in the history of the 3WA. However, during the Gamorian Riots, the two were faced with a huge crisis during which Molly died and Iris lost her left arm.

 Now known as Lady Flair, Iris led the life of an assassin-for-hire. She had briefly aided Waldess as he tried to take control of the galaxy, but was double-crossed by him. She also looks down at the newest team who were given the codename "Lovely Angels," Kei and Yuri.

 During the 'Siren' crisis, Flair was reunited with her old friend Garner, who revealed what had happened when Molly was killed. Guilt-stricken, Iris confronted the cause of the crisis, Waldess, and tried to arrest him, but was killed in the process.

After the crisis was over, Iris' record as Lady Flair was expunged and Iris was posthumously awarded the 3WA's highest honors.

In the flashbacks, Iris and Molly's appearances are identical to the original designs of Kei and Yuri respectively.

 

 Touma

 Touma was a character in the second series. He is a trouble consultant just like Kei and Yuri, but his speciality is computers and computer programs. He looks like your average computer geek; he wears eyeglasses, and has a tall but wiry body. In the course of thinking, Touma also gets distracted by the smallest of details - which often gets him beat up by Kei and Yuri. He is also inexperienced with dating, which led to one of the most hilarious moments in the series.

 Touma's knowledge in computers is almost unmatched. As a college student, he was the one who had written the code to Silica 2000, Worlds World's chief mainframe... and got an "A" for his efforts. When Silica 2000 was compromised by a computer virus, Touma was called upon to eradicate it. However, since Touma is also a target by the creator of the virus, Kei and Yuri went with him as well, and stayed on the planet when Touma began to isolate the computer from the creator... a Joint Artificial Intelligence Criminal, or J.A.I.C.

 

 Calbee

 Calbee is a con-artist who ended up stranded on Worlds World when the J.A.I.C. infected Silica 2000, and later when the Lovely Angels wrecked Narita Spaceport when landing on the planet. An expert in persuasion, he swindles many a lovely girl and takes off with their money.

On the day an unexpected typhoon blows into Tokyo, he was charming another woman at an all-you-can-eat restaurant by relating a story that he was a Tro-Con, when he encountered Kei and Yuri, who had cancelled their reservations at a very pricey French restaurant. Kei had recognized Calbee because she was a victim of his and saw a chance to get the money she and Yuri needed for the restaurant.

What followed next was a pursuit, which resulted in the three ending up stranded miles away from Tokyo and having to walk back on foot. Calbee tried many times to escape, either by guile or by action, but for one reason or another, it all went wrong. In the end, Calbee was brought in, but somehow escaped to do his cons again. Kei and Yuri saw this, but decided not to pursue him again.

 

 Leena

 A florist on Worlds World, Leena had caught the eye of Touma when he and Yuri were caught on one of the planet's planned rainy days. From the time he set eyes on her, Touma was smitten with her. However, for all the planning he made to woo her, there was one fact he didn't calculate on... Leena was a lesbian who had her eyes on Yuri.

 

 Gazelle

 An arrogant, almost sadistic individual, Gazelle was enlisted by the 3WA to teach Kei and Yuri beach volleyball so that they could accomplish their latest mission; capture a corrupt president of a galactic company. In order to do this, Gazelle harshly drove Kei and Yuri to the point of total breakdown, and beyond that. He would do anything to whip the girls into shape, including outright lying; when Kei and Yuri chose to quit after his training reduced Yuri to tears, Gazelle told them how fifty men had suffered at the hands of the president, including his best friend. This gave the girls a renewed sense of duty, to which they resumed their training. On their last day, however, Kei and Yuri sent Gazelle to the hospital by knocking volleyballs primed to explode if touched by anything but their hands back at him.

 After the tournament and subsequent arrest of the president, Kei and Yuri learned from Poporo that the fifty men Gazelle had mentioned hadn't died, but in fact suffered office-related injuries such as Carpel Tunnel Syndrome. They then went to Gazelle's hospital room in a fit of psychosis and proceeded to beat him up.

 

 Monica De Noir

 Coming from a long and honored line of assassins, Monica De Noir, a.k.a. the Sweet Fairy, is given the job of killing Kei and Yuri to celebrate her 15th birthday. Her weapons usually include explosive candy, killer teddy bears, and other cute but deadly items. She also has at her disposal a battle mecha in the form of a teddy bear.

 

 Julian

 The grandson of the 3WA's biggest contributors, Julian is a brilliant but lonely boy who is obsessed with Yuri... so much so that he uses his genius to gather as much information about her as he can, including her likes and dislikes, and constructs an android double of the trouble consultant so that he can be with her.

However, when Kei accidentally breaks the Yuri android, the real Yuri then steps in place until Julian can repair the android. She then lived in what was a life-sized dollhouse, which included an extensive wardrobe. Yuri had to somehow let the boy know that what he was in love with was a doll and not a real person... which ultimately proved to be her undoing at the end of the story, for Julian fell in love with a girl who had been trying to get through to him but he was too obsessed with the android Yuri at the time.

 

 Lily

 Lily was Yuri's temporary partner, who was assigned to her when Kei had quit the 3WA for a brief time. Her personality seems to mirror Yuri's, but even more to the extreme, to the point of appearing as the stereotypical dumb blonde. During her first mission, Lily attempted to use one of Yuri's known tactics to get out of the mission, only to be scolded by Yuri herself and ruined a stakeout. When the 'Siren' crisis erupted, Lily abruptly quit the 3WA, mostly due to the stress of being a trouble consultant.

 Lily was last seen at the end of Mission One, when she was sighted by Kei and Yuri riding in a car with a handsome man.

 

 Mughi

 Mughi is Kei and Yuri's pet cat, found on their first adventure. Mughi is usually left in the care of Chief Poporo, as Yuri is too busy as a trouble consultant or dating.

 Rosa

 Rosa is Chief Poporo's daughter from a previous marriage. While her father would be annoyed about having to care for Mughi, Rosa found the cat entertaining and would often play with him when she visited 3WA Headquarters. It was during one of these visits that Berringer attacked and used the girl to try to get to Poporo.

Episode list

Dirty Pair Flash (1994)
 Opening song: Limitless Answers" by MANA.
 Ending song: "The Second Chapter" by MANA.

Dirty Pair Flash 2 (1995)
 Opening song: "Loving In The Thrill" by Rica Matsumoto.
 Ending song: "I Really Like You" by Mariko Kouda.

Dirty Pair Flash 3 (1995–96) 
 Opening song: "Don't Get Serious" by Mariko Kouda.
 Ending song: "Looking With The Eyes Of The Heart" by Rica Matsumoto

Reception
Mike Crandol of Anime News Network said in a review of Mission II that Kei and Yuri in this series "manage to entertain in their own way," praised the animation as "incredibly polished," and the musical score as well-done. Even so, he criticized these two protagonists for having an inadequate redesign, saying both have become "stereotypes of their former selves," and said that the voices of the characters leaves "something to be desired."

References

Further reading

External links
 

1994 anime OVAs
1995 anime OVAs
1995 manga
1996 manga
ADV Films
Dirty Pair
Sunrise (company)